Filhiol Mound Site is an archaeological site of the Coles Creek culture in Ouachita Parish, Louisiana on a natural levee of the Ouachita River.

Description
Excavations at the site have produced charcoal from beneath the mound which dates to 700–1200 CE. A cemetery established in the 1850s on the mounds summit has helped preserve it.

Location

See also
Culture, phase, and chronological table for the Mississippi Valley

References

External links
 Filhiol Mound Complex Historical Site
 Filhiol Mound - Louisiana Historical Markers on Waymarking.com

Archaeological sites of the Coles Creek culture
Mounds in Louisiana
Geography of Ouachita Parish, Louisiana
Ouachita River